Fernando Massiel Santana (born May 17, 1986) is a former Mexican football player. Born in Temascalapa, he was a midfielder for Zacatepec.

International Tournaments
Massiel Santana played 26 minutes in the 2008 InterLiga for Pumas UNAM receiving a yellow card against Cruz Azul. Later that year he would go on to play three matches (vs. C.D. Luis Ángel Firpo, Houston Dynamo, and scoring a goal against San Francisco F.C.) during the 2008–09 CONCACAF Champions League.

Fernando returned to the 2009–10 CONCACAF Champions League to play in six matches (vs. C.S.D. Comunicaciones, W Connection, Real C.D. España, and C.D. Marathón) for Pumas UNAM.

References

External links
Image

1986 births
Living people
Club Tijuana footballers
C.D. Veracruz footballers
Footballers from the State of Mexico
Association football midfielders
Mexican footballers